Senator Canfield may refer to:

Damon Canfield (1897–1992), Washington State Senate
Robert R. Canfield (1909–1994), Illinois State Senate